Orillia Secondary School, was established in 2015, following the 2013 merger of Orillia District Collegiate & Vocational Institute and Park Street Collegiate Institute. The school has a population of about 1000 students. The new school building was built between 2014 and 2016, and is equipped with a triple gymnasium, technology rooms, a library, and cafeteria. The principal is Peter Bowman.

After the 2012–2013 academic year, Orillia District Collegiate & Vocational Institute was merged with Park Street Collegiate Institute, which was demolished so that a new school could be built on its former site, at the intersection of Park Street and Collegiate Drive.

Notable alumni
Leslie Frost, politician
Gordon Lightfoot, musician
Ethan Moreau, NHL player

See also
List of high schools in Ontario

References 

High schools in Simcoe County
Educational institutions in Canada with year of establishment missing
Buildings and structures in Orillia
1887 establishments in Ontario
Educational institutions established in 1887